Kotara South is a suburb of the City of Lake Macquarie, Greater Newcastle in New South Wales, Australia  from Newcastle's central business district.

History 
The Aboriginal people, in this area, the Awabakal, were the first people of this land.

References

External links
 History of Kotara South (Lake Macquarie City Library)

Suburbs of Lake Macquarie